Prithvi Subba Gurung was sworn in as Chief Minister of Gandaki Province on 12 February 2018. Here is the list of ministers.

Chief Minister & Cabinet Ministers

References

External links 

 Office of Chief Minister and Council of Ministers of Gandaki Province

2018 establishments in Nepal
Government of Gandaki Province